St. Catherine of Siena Parish School may refer to a number of Catholic schools:

 Saint Catherine of Siena Parish School, Laguna Beach, California, part of the Roman Catholic Diocese of Orange
 Saint Catherine of Siena Parish School, Reseda, California, part of the Roman Catholic Archdiocese of Los Angeles

 Saint Catherine of Siena Parish School, Wake Forest, North Carolina, part of the Roman Catholic Diocese of Raleigh

 Saint Catherine of Siena Parish School, Cedar Grove, New Jersey, part of the Roman Catholic Archdiocese of Newark

See also
 Catherine of Siena
 St Catherine's School (disambiguation)
 St. Catherine of Siena Church and School